Los Angeles Airways Flight 417 was a Sikorsky S-61 helicopter that crashed on August 14, 1968 in the city of Compton, California.  All eighteen passengers and three crew members were killed.  The aircraft was destroyed by impact and fire.  According to the National Transportation Safety Board the probable cause of the accident was fatigue failure. The accident happened when the (arbitrarily designated) yellow blade, one of five main rotor blades, separated at the spindle which attached the blade to the rotor head. Following failure, the helicopter was uncontrollable and it fell to the ground. The fatigue crack originated in an area of substandard hardness and inadequate shot peening.

History
Los Angeles Airways (LAA) Flight 417,  piloted by Captain Kenneth Lee Waggoner, former USMC helicopter pilot, was a regularly scheduled passenger flight from Los Angeles International Airport to the Disneyland Heliport in Anaheim, California. The aircraft and crew had completed three round trips to various destinations in the Greater Los Angeles Metropolitan Area beginning at 0607 PDT and departed the ramp at Los Angeles for Flight 417 at 1026. The flight, operating under Visual Flight Rules was cleared by Air traffic control to take off and proceed eastbound at 10:28:15. At 10:32:55 Air Traffic Control advised, "L.A. four seventeen, seven miles east, radar service terminated". The flight acknowledged, "Four seventeen thank you". This was the last known radio contact with the flight.

Statements were obtained from 91 witnesses. A consensus of their observations indicates that the helicopter was proceeding along a normal flightpath when a loud noise or unusual sound was heard. A main rotor blade was either observed to separate or was seen separated in the vicinity of the main rotor disc. As the helicopter fell in variously described gyrations, the tail cone either folded or separated. In order to establish an approximate altitude for the flight, several comparative flights were conducted in a similar helicopter.

Wreckage
The aircraft crashed in Lueders Park in Compton, a recreational park located in a residential area bordering Rosecrans Avenue. The entire fuselage, both engines, main rotor head assembly, four main rotor blades, and the pylon assembly were located in the main impact area. Minor parts associated with this rotor blade were scattered over a three-block area northwest of the park. Examination of the yellow blade spindle (S/N AJ19) revealed a fatigue fracture in the shank of the spindle adjacent to the shoulder in the inboard end of the shank.

Aircraft

 a Sikorsky S-61L helicopter, serial number 61031 was the prototype for the S-61L, and had accumulated 11,863.64 total flying hours prior to the day of the accident.  It is estimated that approximately 3.17 hours were flown on August 14, 1968.  The aircraft was equipped with two General Electric CT58-140-1 turboshaft engines.

Findings
In the course of the investigation by the National Transportation Safety Board (NTSB) they made the following findings:
 The aircraft gross weight and center of gravity were within limits.
 The crewmembers were qualified for the flight.
 The yellow main rotor blade separated in flight rendering the aircraft uncontrollable.
 Blade separation was due to fatigue failure of the spindle.
 The fatigue crack was a high-cycle, low-stress type which propagated over a long period of time.
 The crack initiated because of a combination of the following factors:
Metal hardness below specifications associated with a banded microstructure.
Improper shot peening of the base metal surface.
Possible detrimental effect of residual tensile stress from the plating.
Pitting that may have been present in the base metal surface.
It is believed that the crack was present at the last Magnaglo inspection of the part, and it is not known why it was not detected.

NTSB recommendation and FAA reaction 
Following the initial evidence of a metal fatigue type failure, the National Transportation Safety Board recommended on August 16, 1968 to the Federal Aviation Administration:

On the same date the FAA issued Emergency Airworthiness Directive 68-19-07.  The directive has since been amended twice and now requires the following action:

See also

 List of accidents and incidents involving commercial aircraft
 Los Angeles Airways Flight 841

References

External links
 Amendment 39-2450; Airworthiness Directive 68-19-07
 Air Times: Collector's Guide to Airline Timetables. Shows promotional material listing Disneyland as a destination.
 NTSB Accident Brief on Flight 417
 Los Angeles Airways Helicopter at Disneyland

Aviation accidents and incidents in California
Airliner accidents and incidents caused by mechanical failure
Los Angeles Airways accidents and incidents
1968 in Los Angeles
Disasters in Los Angeles
Compton, California
Aviation accidents and incidents in the United States in 1968
August 1968 events in the United States
Accidents and incidents involving the Sikorsky S-61